All of the 55 Councillor seats for Suffolk Coastal were up for election on Thursday 5 May 2011. This was held on the same day as other local council elections across England.

Overall election result

References

Suffolk Coastal District Council elections